Bernhard Paul "Buddy" Elias (2 June 1925 – 16 March 2015) was a Swiss actor and president of the Anne Frank Fonds, the foundation dedicated to preserving the memory of his cousin Anne Frank.

Biography

Bernhard Paul "Buddy" Elias was born in Frankfurt in Weimar Germany on 2 June 1925. His mother, Helene "Leni" Frank, was Otto Frank's youngest sister, Edith Frank's sister-in-law, and Anne Frank's paternal aunt. His father, Erich Elias (his maternal uncle's brother-in-law), became head of the Basel-based Opekta company in 1929 and Bernhard moved there in 1931 with his mother and brother Stephan. Two years later his maternal grandmother Alice Frank joined them. Otto Frank visited his relatives in Basel on a regular basis, often with his daughters Anne and Margot. They also met in Sils Maria, where another relative lived. Buddy had a good relationship with Margot and in particular with Anne Frank, who was four years younger than him and like Buddy loved ice-skating.

In 1947, Buddy joined Holiday on Ice, where he was the star comedian,  and toured the world with them for over fourteen years. After returning to Basel he started to work as an actor. He acted on stage in Switzerland, the United Kingdom, France, and Germany. In 1965, he married Gertrud "Gerti" Wiedner, an Austrian actress. The couple had two sons, Patrick and Oliver, who became actors. Since 1972, Buddy Elias appeared in almost 80 film and television productions.

Elias was the first cousin and last-surviving close relative of Holocaust diarist Anne Frank, who died in the Bergen-Belsen concentration camp in February or March 1945. Her Diary of a Young Girl became world famous and has been translated in more than 70 languages. The Anne Frank Fonds, founded in 1963 in Basel by Otto Frank, is responsible for the rights of Frank's Diary of a Young Girl, which until his death in 1980 had been headed by her father. As a Member of the Board of Trustees and as president of the Fonds, Buddy Elias dedicated himself to keeping alive the legacy of Anne Frank. He gave many lectures and interviews about the Holocaust and about Anne Frank. Elias was also committed to projects dedicated to stamping out racism and antisemitism. As a president of the Anne Frank Fonds he decided to bring together the estates of the Frank-Elias family in the Jewish Museum Frankfurt.

Elias lived with his wife, Gerti, in Basel, where he died on 16 March 2015.

Filmography 
 1979: Drei Damen vom Grill (TV-series)
 1979: David
 1979: The Magician of Lublin
 1981: Wie der Mond über Feuer und Blut
 1981: Charlotte
 1982: The Magic Mountain
 1982: Kassettenliebe
 1983: Das Traumschiff
 1987: Die Schwarzwaldklinik
 1987: 
 1989–1992: Mit Leib und Seele (ZDF TV-series)
 1990: Die Frosch-Intrige
 1991: 
 1993: Wolffs Revier
 1995: 
 1998: Totalschaden
 1999: St. Angela
 1999: Tatort (part Bienzle und die lange Wut)
 2002: Edel & Starck (part Das Soufflé der Götter)
 2004: Bella Block (part Hinter den Spiegeln)
 2004: Was nützt die Liebe in Gedanken
 2006: Alles Atze (part Die Rückkehr des Lehrers)
 2009: Hunkeler und der Fall Livius
 2014: The Monuments Men

Audioplays 
 Die Abenteuer des Odysseus. Buch Jürgen Knop, Director Ulli Herzog, 1982.
 Hugo Rendler: Finkbeiners Geburtstag. Radio-Tatort, SWR 2010.
 Bibi Blocksberg: Ein verhexter Urlaub
 Benjamin Blümchen as Rudi Rundleder.

Awards 
 2012: Ehrenplakette der Stadt Frankfurt am Main (Medal of Honour of the City Frankfurt am Main)
 2007: Basler Stern

References

Literature

External links 
 Biography Buddy Elias

 
 Buddy Elias at his agency
 „Erinnerungen vom Dachboden“, Interview, Einestages, 28. Februar 2012 
 Website of the Frank Family Center at the Jewish Museum Frankfurt containing a video interview with Buddy Elias.
 biography 
 Obituaries : FAZ, spiegel.de, sueddeutsche.de

1925 births
2015 deaths
German emigrants to Switzerland
Naturalised citizens of Switzerland
Swiss Jews
20th-century German Jews
21st-century German Jews
Jewish German male actors
20th-century Swiss male actors
21st-century Swiss male actors
Swiss male film actors
Swiss male stage actors
Swiss male television actors
Swiss male voice actors
German male film actors
German male stage actors
German male television actors
German male voice actors
Anne Frank